Peter Butler (born  in Gloucester) is a rugby union player who played at Fullback for England between 1975 and 1976.

During his career at international level he won 2 England caps and scored 2 penalties, 2 conversions (10 test points).

As a child Peter Butler attended Finlay Road Infants and Juniors School.

References

1951 births
English rugby union players
England international rugby union players
Rugby union fullbacks
Living people
Gloucestershire County RFU players
Rugby union players from Gloucester